Loukas Karadimos (born 6 August 1974) is a Greek professional football manager and former player.

References

External links

Greek footballers
Greek football managers
PAOK FC players
A.O. Kerkyra players
Atromitos F.C. players
Kavala F.C. players
Kallithea F.C. players
Super League Greece players
Living people
1974 births
Ionikos F.C. managers
Proodeftiki F.C. managers
Ethnikos Piraeus F.C. managers
Egaleo F.C. managers
Association football midfielders
Footballers from Livadeia